Armagh County Council was the authority responsible for local government in County Armagh, Northern Ireland.

History
Armagh County Council was formed under orders issued in accordance with the Local Government (Ireland) Act 1898 which came into effect on 18 April 1899. It was originally based at the Armagh Courthouse but moved to Charlemont Place in 1945. It was abolished in accordance with the Local Government Act (Northern Ireland) 1972 on 1 October 1973.

References

County councils of Northern Ireland